Îles-Avelle-Wight-et-Hiam Ecological Reserve is an ecological reserve located in Vaudreuil-Dorion, Quebec, Canada. It was established on

References

External links
 Official website from Government of Québec

Protected areas of Montérégie
Nature reserves in Quebec
Protected areas established in 1994
1994 establishments in Quebec
Vaudreuil-Dorion